Amitava Nandy (12 March 1943 – 15 August 2014) was a member of the 14th Lok Sabha of India. He represented the Dum Dum constituency of West Bengal and was a member of the Communist Party of India (Marxist) (CPI(M)) political party. He had been one of the most successful MPs during his tenure. 

Nandy used to take initiatives in commemorating the 'Amar Ekushe February'(the Immortal 21 February) every year, endeavouring to promote cultural oneness between the two 'Bengals' which had once been partitioned as a result of a political conspiracy. He died of cancer in 2014.

His wife Ila Nandy is an ex-councillor of Bidhannagar Municipality.

References

External links
 Official biographical sketch in Parliament of India website

2014 deaths
1943 births
Communist Party of India (Marxist) politicians from West Bengal
People from North 24 Parganas district
India MPs 2004–2009
Lok Sabha members from West Bengal